Pope is a religious title traditionally accorded to the Bishop of Rome, the Coptic and Greek Orthodox Bishop of Alexandria, and some leaders of other ecclesial communities. Popes may also claim the title Patriarch. Both terms come from the Greek πάππας, father.

Etymology
The word pope is derived ultimately from the Greek πάππας (páppas) originally an affectionate term meaning "father", later referring to a bishop or patriarch. The earliest record of the use of this title is in regard to the Patriarch of Alexandria, Pope Heraclas of Alexandria (232–248) in a letter written by his successor, Pope Dionysius of Alexandria, to Philemon, a Roman presbyter:

Which translates into:

From the early 3rd century the title was applied generically to all bishops. The earliest extant record of the word papa being used in reference to a Bishop of Rome dates to late 3rd century, when it was applied to Pope Marcellinus.

According to the Oxford English Dictionary, the earliest recorded use of the title "pope" in English is in an Old English translation (c. 950) of Bede's Ecclesiastical History of the English People:

In Modern English:

Later history and contemporary use
The title pope continues to be used by Alexandrian bishops; both the Coptic Orthodox and Greek Orthodox Patriarchs of Alexandria are known as the "Pope and Patriarch of Alexandria".

In the Western Christian world "pope" is chiefly associated with the Bishops of Rome — from the 5th or 6th century it became, in the West, a title reserved exclusively for these bishops. Despite its earlier use to refer to any bishop, in 998 an Archbishop of Milan was rebuked for having called himself "pope", and in 1073 it was formally decided by Pope Gregory VII that no other bishop of the Catholic Church would hold the title.

In the Slavic languages of many Eastern Orthodox countries the term "pope" (поп, піп; pop) means "priest"; these include Russian, Ukrainian, Serbian, and Bulgarian. The Romanian popă has the same meaning. When context is clear, "pope" may also be used in English to mean "Eastern Orthodox priest".

See also
Catholic Church
Honorific
List of Patriarchs of Alexandria
Greek Orthodox Patriarch of Alexandria
List of Greek Orthodox Patriarchs of Alexandria
Pope of the Coptic Orthodox Church of Alexandria
List of Coptic Orthodox Popes of Alexandria
Pope
List of popes (Bishops of Rome)

References

External links

Catholic Online: The Pope

English words
Honorifics
Religious honorifics
Titles
Religious titles